Gollujeh-ye Abellu (also Romanized as Gollūjeh-ye Abellū; also known as Goljeh, Gollūjeh, Golujeh, and Gyulyudzha) is a village in Azghan Rural District, in the Central District of Ahar County, East Azerbaijan Province, Iran. At the 2006 census, its population was 77, in 23 families.

References 

Populated places in Ahar County